Governor Chase may refer to:

Ira Joy Chase (1834–1895), 22nd Governor of Indiana
Salmon P. Chase (1808–1873), 23rd Governor of Ohio